Alexander Georgiyevich Gromov (in , b. May 19, 1947, in Odintsovo, Moscow Oblast, Soviet Union) is a Russian politician.

Gromov served in the KGB during 1973–1991. As a KGB officer he took part in the Soviet–Afghan War. During January–May 2000 he was the chairman of the Russian Federal Service for Currency and Export Control. Since February 12, 2001, he has been a first deputy plenipotentiary presidential envoy to the Central Federal District.

References

KGB officers
Russian politicians
Soviet military personnel of the Soviet–Afghan War
1947 births
Living people